Indira Nagar (Hindi: इंदिरा नगर) is a residential area in Lucknow in the Indian state of Uttar Pradesh. It is developed and maintained by the U.P. Housing and Development Board Also Known As (Awas Vikas Parishad) and is one of the largest colonies in “Asia” .
Also,
It is one of the biggest and posh residential settlement planned in India

History 

Indira Nagar (originally named as Indira Nagar, but it was changed to Ram Sagar Mishra Nagar by CM Ram Naresh Yadav during Janta Government) was a colony originally planned to have four blocks. It expanded to encompass 25 blocks. Surrounding villages merged with the colony during the expansion.

Temples 
Bhoothnath Temple in Indira Nagar is one of the oldest shrines in Lucknow, holding high religious importance. A statue of Lord Hanuman is installed in the main temple premises and on Tuesdays, you can see a long queue of devotees waiting patiently to offer their prayers. Besides, there are also idols of Goddess Parvati and Lord Shiva along with Nandi (the bull of Shiva) here. The entire nearby region has been developed with the same name along with the Bhoothnath Market, which has now become a significant market in Indira Nagar area of Lucknow.

Satya Mandir, B-116/2, Indira Nagar, Lucknow is a temple which is known globally around the world, where Lipi Roop Darshan of Almighty Lord is situated on both sides of Lord Krishna. Satya Mandir is the Head Office of Vani Publication, Vani Samiti, Humanity Foundation of India, Satyatirth Pashu Pakshi Sanrakshan Kendra Societies.
'Bhagwan ki Vani' is a collection of Divine Message which is published in the form of 400 books. Bhaktvatsal Srikrishna is a Magazine is being published from this place for last 16 years and being sent around the world.

Papa ji ka Sathsang is also situated in Indira Nagar, Papa Ji himself lived in Indira Nagar. Mooji has lived in Indira Nagar when he was under the discipleship of Papa Ji.

Blocks and markets 

Bhootnath (B-Block) is the main market. Other markets are the group of Lekhraj Market Complexes, Amrapali Market, Sahara Shopping Centre, Meena Market (A-Block), Shivaji Market, Nagina Plaza, Hanuman Mandir Market (C-Block), and Munshi Pulia (D-Block).
Bank branches, guest houses, banquet halls, hospitals, chemists, restaurants and construction material shops are there. Schools, government offices and utilities are there. It is one of the biggest and posh residential settlement planned in India.

Hospitals & Clinics 
Dr Devesh Singh Skin & V.D. Clinic
Medical facilities are mainly provided by Private Services or doctors. Some of the major hospitals are:
 Shourya Polyclinic And Vaccination Centre 
 Ujala Hospital
 Shekhar Hospital
 State Institute of Health & Welfare
 Jankalyan Eye Hospital
Sriram Hospital
Shalimar Hospital
CNS HOSPITAL
 Urovision Clinic
 The Velvet Skin Centre

Parks 
Parks include:
Aurobindo Park
Hari Om Park near Bhootnath
Bandhu Park
Sai Ram Park
Major Ritesh Sharma Park
Swarn Jayanti Park and Adarsh Park developed by Avas Vikas are the two most well-known. 
Maharana Pratap Park
Smriti Vihar Park

Roads 

The roads are laid out in a grid. Major roads running through and around Indiranagar are Ring Road, Church Road, Sitapur Road and Faizabad Road. The whole colony is served by auto-rickshaws and E-rickshaws. Transportation on major roads also have service of Local City Buses. Another common medium is manual rickshaws. Now metro is also used for transportation

Metro 

Munshi Pulia metro station is the metro station from where the metro train starts for Lucknow Charbagh railway station and Lucknow airport. There are 10 stops of metro between Munshi Pulia metro station and Charbagh Railway Station and there are 8 stops between Charbagh Railway Station and Chaudhary Charan Singh Airport of Lucknow. Indira Nagar has metro stations namely
Lekhraj Metro Station 
Bhootnath Market Metro Station
Indira Nagar Metro Station
Munshipuliya Metro Station

Schools 

Most of the schools in Indira Nagar are operating within localities. Some of them are:
 Red Hill Kindergarten (A Block)
 Spring Dale College, A-Block
 St. Dominic near Bhootnath Market (B-Block)
 St.John's School(B-Block)
 City Montessori School (A-Block)
 Sherwood Academy (Sector 25)
 St Mary's (D-Block)
 Rani Laxmi Bai Memorial Senior Secondary School (C-block and Sector 14)
 Central Academy Lucknow (Sector 9)
 Delhi Public School (Sector 19)
 D.A.V. Public School (Sector 18)
 Eram Inter College (C-Block)
 New Way School (A-Block)
 Gurukul Academy (B-Block)
 United World School (Sector 15)
 ICCMRT, Lucknow (Sector 21)
 Holy Shrine Inter College
 Kiddy Kingdom Academy (A Block) 
 Kidzee School (Sector 16)
Manash Vihar, Picnic Spot Road
Dabble College (Sector-15)
Gurukul Academy, English Medium, Sector-B, ICSE &ISc.Board, New Delhi, Primary-Class-12, Bhoothnath Mkt.
Spring Dale College, ICSE Board, Sector-A.
Canossa Convent, Sector-C
Study Point (A-Block) Tubewell Colony
st Mary's inter college(sector-14)
 SARASWATI BALIKA INTER  COLLEGE(EST-1965),D-BLOCK

References

External links 
 Indira Nagar, Lucknow at wikimapia

Neighbourhoods in Lucknow